Sculptor is the third studio album by Australian indie folk band Luluc. It was released on 13 July 2018, under Sub Pop.

Critical reception

Sculptor was met with "generally favourable" reviews from critics. At Metacritic, which assigns a weighted average rating out of 100 to reviews from mainstream publications, this release received an average score of 78, based on 11 reviews. Aggregator Album of the Year gave the release a 74 out of 100 based on a critical consensus of 10 reviews.

Track listing

Personnel

Musicians
 Steve Hassett – vocals, guitar, drums, producer
 Zoë Randell – guitar, producer
 Matthew Eccles – drums
 J Mascis – guitar
 Jim White – drums
 Dave Nelson – trumpet
 Aaron Dessner – guitar

Production
 Jonathan Low – engineer
 Charlotte De Mezamat – photography

References

2018 albums
Sub Pop albums